Garyville/Mt.Airy Math and Science Magnet School is located in Garyville, Louisiana in St. John the Baptist Parish. Garyville Magnet's mascot is a timberwolf. It is an accredited learning facility since the year 2007–2008 school year.

External links
 Garyville Magnet Website

Public elementary schools in Louisiana
Schools in St. John the Baptist Parish, Louisiana
Magnet schools in Louisiana